SEAL Patrol is a 2014 action-thriller film directed and co-written by Nicolas Mezzanatto. Released straight-to-DVD on February 11, 2014, it stars James C. Burns, Kristina Anapau, Roark Critchlow, Rich McDonald and Eric Roberts.

Premise
After losing contact with a clandestine energy research facility, a powerful venture capitalist contracts a private team of elite military operatives to retrieve a physicist who holds the key to an unprecedented alternate energy source.

Cast
 Kristina Anapau as Lisa Westbrook
 James C. Burns as Lewis Locke
 Tina Casciani as Sarah
 Courtney Compton as Journalist
 Jose Luis Cordovez as Chechen Terrorist
 Roark Critchlow as Dr. Whitmore
 Josh Daugherty as Ed Cox
 Brett Donowho as Vincent "V" Hightower
 Danny James as Creature
 Angel McCord as Allison Whitmore
 Rich McDonald as Jonathan Gates
 James C. Morris as Creature
 Will Newman as Chechen Leader
 Daniel O'Meara as Jeffery Preston
 Eric Roberts as Mr. Cromwell
 Joshua St. James as Henry Cox

2010s English-language films